Álvaro Octavio Melián Lafinur (16 May 1893 – 1958) was an Argentinian poet and critic.

Born in Buenos Aires in 1893, he was the son of the Uruguayan lawyer and writer Luis Melián Lafinur and also the second cousin of writer Jorge Luis Borges. In 1910, while working at the Spanish newspaper El País, he published Borges' work, a translation of Oscar Wilde's The Happy Prince, for the first time.

References

1893 births
1958 deaths
Argentine male poets
Argentine literary critics
Argentine people of Uruguayan descent
20th-century Argentine poets
20th-century Argentine male writers
Date of death missing
Writers from Buenos Aires